KRMZ, virtual channel 24 (VHF digital channel 10), is a Public Broadcasting Service (PBS) member television station licensed to Steamboat Springs, Colorado, United States. Owned by Rocky Mountain Public Media, Inc., it is one of the five full-service transmitters of the Rocky Mountain PBS state network, broadcasting from atop Quarry Mountain west of town. Master control and internal operations are based at Rocky Mountain PBS' headquarters in the Buell Public Media Center in downtown Denver.

KRMZ has been part of the Rocky Mountain PBS network since 2007. Prior to that, it was an independent television station based in Steamboat Springs, then a Telemundo affiliate which was seen in Denver on two low-power stations.

History

Early years
On May 5, 1986, the Federal Communications Commission (FCC) granted a construction permit to Constance J. Wodlinger for a new television station on channel 24 in Steamboat Springs. Wodlinger owned radio stations in the Kansas City market. Channel 24 began broadcasting as an independent television station in the second half of December 1987, as KSBS-TV; Wodlinger was joined by several other investors in Steamboat Broadcast System, Inc., which owned the station, including president Thomas Greer. Local programming on channel 24 at launch included Steamboat Breakfast Club, a daily morning show with news and features; a daily news program; and telecourses from Colorado Mountain College. The station filled out its broadcast day with programs from the Satellite Program Network and music videos from Wodlinger-owned Hit Video USA. Greer, who had previously produced a program called Ski TV which aired on ESPN, had plans to start similar stations in other Colorado ski cities. The station sold itself to advertisers seeking to reach ski visitors, noting that it was the only television signal carried in some of the town's hotels.

KSBS-TV was sold in 1991 to Frederick I. Shaffer III for $250,000. Under Shaffer, KSBS-TV primarily broadcast tourist information programming and content from the Resort Sports Network.

Going Telemundo
Another sale came in March 1995 to GreenTV Corporation, headed by David Drucker. Drucker's purchase marked the first connection between KSBS-TV and a Denver station, since he owned KUBD, Denver's Telemundo affiliate. However, Drucker and his partner in Denver, Charlie Ergen, sold KUBD two months later to Paxson Communications Corporation. Paxson immediately switched that station to the same Infomall TV infomercial programming used on its other stations.

Telemundo moved from KUBD to KSBS-TV, which appeared on two translators in Denver—KMAS-LP (channel 63) and KSBS-LP (channel 18)—and also began a fight to get onto important cable systems in Denver for the first time using must-carry rules. In 1997, TCI added KSBS to its Denver cable systems, replacing Galavisión.

In 2000, KSBS-TV was purchased by Council Tree Communications of Longmont, in which one of the investors was an Alaska Native-owned corporation; the new owners changed the call letters to KMAS-TV for más, the Spanish word for "more". Council Tree then deepened its involvement with Telemundo by making a $181 million investment in exchange for a 17 percent stake in the network—which still was a controlling stake because of ownership restrictions; the transaction also made KMAS-TV a network owned-and-operated station. KMAS-TV then was sold along with the network to NBC in October 2001.

From Telemundo to PBS
In 2006, Longmont Broadcasting sold its television station in that city, KDEN-TV (channel 25), to NBC, and Telemundo moved there from KMAS-TV and its two translators on March 6, a switch giving Telemundo signal parity with other Denver TV stations. It was the third station purchase made by Telemundo in a year, after its purchase of KBLR-TV in Las Vegas and a license swap that gave Telemundo a full-power signal in Phoenix.

The Steamboat Springs station was now surplus to NBC's needs, and it was taken silent. The chief engineer of KMAS-TV, a former Rocky Mountain PBS employee, suggested that the company donate the station to the public broadcaster. After several visits to the site and the repair of the transmitter, the station returned to the air in August 2007 as KRMZ, the fifth full-service transmitter in the Rocky Mountain PBS network.

References

External links

Television channels and stations established in 1987
1987 establishments in Colorado
RMZ
Steamboat Springs, Colorado